Brachylia is a genus of moths in the family Cossidae.

Species
 Brachylia albida Yakovlev & Saldaitis, 2011
 Brachylia eberti Yakovlev, 2011
 Brachylia eutelia Clench, 1959
 Brachylia fon Yakovlev & Saldaitis, 2011
 Brachylia hercules Yakovlev, 2011
 Brachylia incanescens (Butler, 1875)
 Brachylia kwouus (Karsch, 1898)
 Brachylia murzini Yakovlev, 2011
 Brachylia nigeriae (Bethune-Baker, 1915)
 Brachylia nussi Yakovlev, 2011
 Brachylia rectangulata (Wichgraf, 1921)
 Brachylia reussi (Strand, 1913)
 Brachylia semicurvatus (Gaede, 1930)
 Brachylia senegalensis Yakovlev & Saldaitis, 2011
 Brachylia terebroides Felder, 1874
 Brachylia vukutu Yakovlev & Lenz, 2013
 Brachylia windhoekensis (Strand, 1913)

Former species
 Brachylia acronyctoides

References

 , 1959: Notes on African Cossidae. Veröffentlichungen der Zoologischen Staatssammlung München, 6: 3-27. Full article: .
 , 2011: Catalogue of the family Cossidae of the Old World (Lepidoptera). Neue Entomologische Nachrichten, 66: 1–129.
 , 2013: On the Fauna of Cossidae (Lepidoptera) of Zimbabwe with description of a new species. Zootaxa, 3718 (4): 387-397. Abstract: .
 , 2013: The Cossidae (Lepidoptera) of Malawi with descriptions of two new species. Zootaxa, 3709 (4): 371-393. Abstract:

External links
Natural History Museum Lepidoptera generic names catalog

Cossinae
Moth genera